Maya Burman (born 1971) is a French artist.

Biography
Burman was born in Lot et Garrone, France and brought up in France. She initially trained as an architect, but found the profession too restrictive and turned her hand to painting. 
She works mainly in pen and ink, and watercolor. This spontaneous media encourages her to create series of works, because overworking or reworking each painting with new ideas is difficult. She has had exhibitions of her work in India, France, and the UK.

She is the youngest member of an extended family of artists: her father, Sakti Burman (from Kolkata) and French mother Maite Delteil, are both prominent artists, as are her cousin, Jayasri Burman and Jayasri's husband, Paresh Maity.

Awards
 Award for Young Painters - Salon de Colombes (1997)
 Award of the Fine Art Association of Sannois (1998)
 Award of the Salon d'Automne Paris (2000)
 Award of Watercolours Painting Section Salon de Colombes (2001)

Personal life
Burman had a mariage in India at age 23 and subsequently had a son. The marriage ended after two years and Burman returned with her son to France.

References

External links
Chennai Online review of a Maya Burman show - includes a picture of the artist
Profile on Saffronart website

1971 births
20th-century French painters
21st-century French painters
20th-century Indian painters
Living people
French Hindus
French people of Indian descent
Indian women painters
20th-century French women artists
21st-century French women artists
20th-century Indian women